Coprophagia or coprophagy is the consumption of feces. Coprophagy refers to many kinds of feces-eating, including eating feces of other species (heterospecifics), of other individuals (allocoprophagy), or one's own (autocoprophagy) – those once deposited or taken directly from the anus.

In humans, coprophagia has been described since the late 19th century in individuals with mental illnesses and in some sexual acts, such as the practices of rimming and felching where sex partners insert their tongue into each other's anus and ingest biologically significant amounts of feces.  Some animal species eat feces as a normal behavior, in particular lagomorphs, which do so to allow tough plant materials to be digested more thoroughly by passing twice through the digestive tract. Other species may eat feces under certain conditions.

Coprophagia by humans

In cuisine 
The feces of the rock ptarmigan is used in Urumiit, which is a delicacy in some Inuit cuisine. Several beverages are made using the feces of animals, including but not limited to Kopi luwak, panda tea, insect tea, and Black Ivory Coffee. Casu martzu is a cheese that uses the digestive processes of live maggots to help ferment and break down the cheese's fats.

As a supposed medical treatment 
Ayurveda and Siddha medicine use various animal excreta in various forms. The dung and urine of the Zebu is especially important in the list.

Centuries ago (mid 16th century) physicians tasted their patients' feces, to better judge their state and condition, according to François Rabelais, who studied medicine but was also a writer of satirical and grotesque fiction. Further information is needed to confirm the accuracy and context of statement.

Lewin reported, "... consumption of fresh, warm camel feces has been recommended by Bedouins as a remedy for bacterial dysentery; its efficacy (probably attributable to the antibiotic subtilisin from Bacillus subtilis) was anecdotally confirmed by German soldiers in Africa during World War II". However, this story is likely a myth, independent research was not able to verify any of these claims.

As a cult practice 
Members of a religious cult in Thailand routinely ate the feces and dead skin of their leader, whom they considered to be a holy man with healing powers.

As a paraphilia 
Coprophilia is a paraphilia (DSM-5), where the object of sexual interest is feces, and may be associated with coprophagia. Coprophagia is sometimes depicted in pornography, usually under the term "scat" (from scatology). A notorious example of this is the pornographic shock video 2 Girls 1 Cup. The 120 Days of Sodom, a 1785 novel by Marquis de Sade, is full of detailed descriptions of erotic sadomasochistic coprophagia.

Coprophagia has also been observed in some people with schizophrenia and pica.

Coprophagia by nonhuman animals

By invertebrates 

Coprophagous insects consume and redigest the feces of large animals. These feces contain substantial amounts of semidigested food, particularly in the case of herbivores, owing to the inefficiency of the large animals' digestive systems. Thousands of species of coprophagous insects are known, especially among the orders Diptera and Coleoptera. Examples of such flies are Scathophaga stercoraria and Sepsis cynipsea, dung flies commonly found in Europe around cattle droppings. Among beetles, dung beetles are a diverse lineage, many of which feed on the microorganism-rich liquid component of mammals' dung, and lay their eggs in balls composed mainly of the remaining fibrous material.

Termites eat one another's feces as a means of obtaining their hindgut protists. Termites and protists have a symbiotic relationship (e.g. with the protozoan that allows the termites to digest the cellulose in their diet). For example, in one group of termites,  a three-way symbiotic relationship exists; termites of the family Rhinotermitidae, cellulolytic protists of the genus Pseudotrichonympha in the guts of these termites, and intracellular bacterial symbionts of the protists.

By vertebrates 
Domesticated and wild mammals are sometimes coprophagic, and in some species, this forms an essential part of their method of digesting tough plant material.

Some dogs may lack critical digestive enzymes when they are only eating processed dried foods, so they gain these from consuming fecal matter. They only consume fecal matter that is less than two days old which supports this theory.

Species within the Lagomorpha (rabbits, hares, and pikas) produce two types of fecal pellets: hard ones, and soft ones called cecotropes. Animals in these species reingest their cecotropes, to extract further nutrients. Cecotropes derive from chewed plant material that collects in the cecum, a chamber between the large and small intestine, containing large quantities of symbiotic bacteria that help with the digestion of cellulose and also produce certain B vitamins. After excretion of the soft cecotrope,  it is again eaten whole by the animal and redigested in a special part of the stomach. The pellets remain intact for up to six hours in the stomach; the bacteria within continue to digest the plant carbohydrates. This double-digestion process enables these animals to extract nutrients that they may have missed during the first passage through the gut, as well as the nutrients formed by the microbial activity. This process serves the same purpose within these animals as rumination (cud-chewing) does in cattle and sheep. 

Cattle in the United States are often fed chicken litter. Concerns have arisen that the practice of feeding chicken litter to cattle could lead to bovine spongiform encephalopathy (mad-cow disease) because of the crushed bone meal in chicken feed. The U.S. Food and Drug Administration regulates this practice by attempting to prevent the introduction of any part of cattle brain or spinal cord into livestock feed. Other countries, such as Canada, have banned chicken litter for use as a livestock feed.

The young of elephants, giant pandas, koalas, and hippos eat the feces of their mothers or other animals in the herd, to obtain the bacteria required to properly digest vegetation found in their ecosystems. When such animals are born, their intestines are sterile and do not contain these bacteria. Without doing this, they would be unable to obtain any nutritional value from plants. Piglets with access to maternal feces early in life exhibited better performance.

Hamsters, guinea pigs, chinchillas, hedgehogs, and pigs

eat their own droppings, which are thought to be a source of vitamins B and K, produced by gut bacteria. Sometimes, there is also the aspect of self-anointment while these creatures eat their droppings. On rare occasions gorillas have been observed consuming their feces, possibly out of boredom, a desire for warm food, or to reingest seeds contained in the feces.

Coprophagia by plants 
Some carnivorous plants, such as pitcher plants of the genus Nepenthes, obtain nourishment from the feces of commensal animals. Notable examples include Nepenthes jamban, whose specific name is the Indonesian word for toilet.

See also 
 Coprophilous fungi
 Fecal bacteriotherapy
 Fecal–oral route, a route of disease transmission
 Gomutra
 Kopi luwak
 Panchagavya
 Pig toilet
 Scathophagidae 
 Scatophagidae

References

Further reading

External links 

Eating behaviors
Ethology
Feces
Pica (disorder)